The 52d Operations Group is the flying component of the 52d Fighter Wing, assigned to the United States Air Forces in Europe - Air Forces Africa (USAFE-AFAFRICA). The group is stationed at Spangdahlem Air Base, Germany.

Overview
The 52d Operations Group maintains, deploys and employs F-16 Falcon; MQ-9 Reaper aircraft and AN/TPS-75 radar systems in support of North Atlantic Treaty Organization (NATO) and national defense directives. The 52 OG supports the Supreme Allied Commander Europe with mission-ready personnel and systems providing expeditionary air power for suppression of enemy air defenses, close air support, air interdiction, counterair, air strike control, strategic attack, combat search and rescue, and theater airspace control.

The group also supports contingencies and operations other than war as required.

Assigned Units

The 52 OG (Tail Code: SP) commands one flying squadron, one air control and one support squadron
 480th Fighter Squadron "Warhawks" (Red tail stripe)
 The 480 FS flies the F-16 Fighting Falcon aircraft conducting air superiority missions.
 52d Operations Support Squadron "Griffins"
 Responsible for all facets of airfield operations, air traffic control, weather, aircrew life support and training, intelligence analysis and support, weapons and tactics training, 52 FW battle staff operations, airspace scheduling, range ops and wing flying hour program.
 Detachment 2
 Currently operating General Atomics MQ-9 Reaper temporarily deployed to Campia Turzil (RoAF 71st Air Base) from their usual base of Miroslawiec (12th Air Base).

History
 See 52d Fighter Wing for additional lineage and history

World War II
The unit was constituted as the 52d Pursuit Group (Interceptor) on 20 November 1940, activated at Selfridge Field, Michigan on 15 January 1941 with the 2d, 4th, and 5th Pursuit Squadrons assigned as its original squadrons.  It was redesignated as the 52d Fighter Group in May 1942. The group trained with Bell P-39 Airacobra and Curtiss P-40 aircraft, and participated in maneuvers with them until 1942 when it moved to the United Kingdom, the air echelon arriving in July 1942 and the ground echelon in August.

The group trained with the Royal Air Force as part of Eighth Air Force, reequipped with Supermarine Spitfires and flew missions from England to France during August and September of that year.

Group pilots flew Spitfires from Gibraltar to Algeria during Operation Torch, the invasion of North Africa on 8 November 1942. The remainder of the group arrived by ship after the campaign in Algeria and Morocco had ended. The group then operated as part of Twelfth Air Force through April 1944, thereafter becoming a part of Fifteenth Air Force, serving in combat in the Mediterranean until the end of World War II. It flew escort, patrol, strafing, and reconnaissance missions to help defeat Axis forces in Tunisia. In Sicily, it attacked railroads, highways, bridges, coastal shipping and other targets to support the Allied operations. Having converted to North American P-51 Mustangs in April and May 1944, the group escorted bombers that attacked objectives in Italy, France, Germany, Czechoslovakia, Austria, Hungary, Romania, and Yugoslavia. It received a Distinguished Unit Citation (DUC) for a mission on 9 June 1944 when the group protected bombers that struck aircraft factories, communications centers, and supply lines in Germany. The 52d flew one of the first shuttle missions to Russia from 4–6 August 1944, and received a second DUC for strafing attacks on a landing field in Romania on 31 August 1944, destroying a large number of enemy fighter and transport planes. On 24 March 1945, the group's aircraft flew the longest escort mission ever flown in Europe—1600 miles round-trip to Berlin. By the end of the war, the group's Mustangs had adopted yellow markings that covered the entire tail of the aircraft, earning them the nickname of "Yellow Tails. The 52d returned to the US in August 1945 and was inactivated on 7 November 1945.

Cold War

German Occupation Force
The 52d was reactivated in Germany on 9 November 1946 and was assigned to United States Air Forces Europe as the 52d Fighter Group (All Weather). It received Northrop P-61 Black Widows in early 1947, From 1946 to 1947, the 52d served as part of the occupation forces in Germany.

Air Defense Command

In June 1947 the group was transferred without personnel and equipment to the United States, and became the 52d Fighter-Interceptor Group in May 1951 again flying P-61s and later North American F-82 Twin Mustangs, receiving its first jets, Lockheed F-94 Starfires beginning in 1950. In 1947, the Air Force began a service test of what was called the Hobson Plan to unify control at air bases. As a result of this test, the group was assigned to a provisional fighter wing at Mitchel Air Force Base, New York.  This test proved the wing-base plan to the satisfaction of the Air Force and in 1948 group was assigned as the operational element of the 52d Fighter Wing before moving with the wing to McGuire Air Force Base, New Jersey. In a major reorganization of Air Defense Command (ADC) responding to ADC's difficulty under the existing wing base organizational structure in deploying fighter squadrons to best advantage. the 52d was inactivated along with the 52nd Fighter-Interceptor Wing on 6 February 1952 and its two operational squadrons were transferred to the recently activated 4709th Defense Wing.

The 52d was redesignated the 52d Fighter Group (Air Defense) and activated at Suffolk County Air Force Base, New York on 18 August 1955, replacing the 519th Air Defense Group as part of ADC's Project Arrow, a program to restore fighter units that had achieved distinction in the two World Wars. Because one of the additional objectives of Project Arrow was to reunite groups with their traditional squadrons, the 2d and 5th Fighter-Interceptor Squadrons (FIS) moved to Suffolk County from McGuire and took over the personnel, equipment, and radar equipped and rocket armed North American F-86D Sabre aircraft of the 75th and 331st FIS, which moved elsewhere. It also became the USAF host organization for Suffolk County and was assigned several support units to fulfill this function.

The 2d FIS converted to F-102 Delta Daggers in January 1957, followed by the 5th FIS in April. In December 1959, the 2d FIS began to fly F-101 Voodoos, while the 5th FIS retained its F-102s until moving to Minot Air Force Base, North Dakota two months later. The group served as an air defense unit in the New York/New Jersey area of the United States and also flew anti-submarine warfare missions until being inactivated in 1963 and replaced as the host unit at Suffolk County by the 52d Fighter Wing (Air Defense). In 1968, as USAF operations at Suffolk County were reduced, it once again activated with F-101s to replace the 52d wing and close down USAF operations at the station in 1969.

Return to Germany

The 52d was redesignated the 52d Tactical Fighter Group and activated at Erding Air Base, West Germany under Seventeenth Air Force in 1971. The group provided administrative and logistical support as the USAF host unit at Erding for F-102 Delta Dagger NATO air defense operations, but had no tactical units assigned. In 1972 the F-102s were withdrawn from Europe and the 52d FG was inactivated.

Modern era
On 31 March 1992, the group was redesignated the 52d Operations Group  (OG) and activated as a result of the USAF objective wing reorganization. Upon activation, the 52d OG assumed responsibility for the 52 Fighter Wing's operational squadrons and the newly activated 52d Operations Support Squadron.

During the 1990s, the wing supported no-fly zone operations over Bosnia and northern Iraq and combat operations against Serbia during Operation Allied Force in 1999. After terrorist attacks on the United States in 2001, the wing supported Operations Enduring Freedom and Iraqi Freedom, deploying combat and support elements in support of US and NATO missions.  Although the group has also provided forces for Operation Urgent Fury, Operation Just Cause, Operation Southern Watch, Operation Coronet Macaw, Operation Restore Hope, Operation Support Justice and Operation Uphold Democracy, its forces were organized into provisional organizations, rather than remaining under group control for operations.

On 9 November 2012, the 52nd OG formed a detachment at Łask Air Base in Poland – 52nd OG Det 1.

The 81st Fighter Squadron was inactivated at Spangdahlem on 18 June 2013, leaving the 480th Fighter Squadron as the 52nd OG's sole flying unit.

Lineage
 Constituted as the 52d Pursuit Group (Interceptor) on 20 November 1940
 Activated on 16 January 1941
 Redesignated 52d Fighter Group on 15 May 1942
 Redesignated 52d Fighter Group, Single Engine ca. 20 August 1943
 Inactivated on 7 November 1945
 Redesignated 52d Fighter Group (All Weather) on 18 October 1946
 Activated on 9 November 1946
 Redesignated: 52d Fighter Group, All Weather on 10 May 1948
 Redesignated: 52d Fighter-All Weather Group on 20 January 1950
 Redesignated: 52d Fighter-Interceptor Group on 1 May 1951
 Inactivated on 6 February 1952
 Redesignated 52d Fighter Group (Air Defense) on 20 June 1955
 Activated on 18 August 1955
 Discontinued and inactivated, on 1 July 1963
 Activated on 30 September 1968
 Inactivated on 31 December 1969
 Redesignated 52d Tactical Fighter Group on 17 February 1970
 Activated on 1 April 1971
 Inactivated on 31 July 1972
 Redesignated 52d Operations Group on 1 March 1992
 Activated on 31 March 1992

Assignments

 6th Pursuit Wing, 16 January 1941
 I Interceptor (later, I Fighter) Command, 1 October 1941
 First Air Force, c. 15 June 1942
 VIII Fighter Command (attached to Royal Air Force), 13 July 1942
 6th Pursuit Wing, 18 August 1942
 XII Fighter Command, 14 September 1942 (attached to Tunis Fighter Sector, ca. 19 January 1943)
 XII Air Support Command, 18 February 1943
 North West African Coastal Air Force, 23 May 1943
 1st Air Defense Wing, 19 August 1943
 62d Fighter Wing, 1943
 63d Fighter Wing, 16 November 1943
 Fifteenth Air Force, 1 May 1944
 306th Bombardment (later, 306th Fighter) Wing, 3 May 1944
 305th Bombardment Wing, 13 June – August 1945
 Third Air Force, 22 August – 7 November 1945

 64th Fighter Wing, 9 November 1946
 XII Tactical Air Command, 15 May 1947
 Air Defense Command, 25 June 1947
 First Air Force, 29 October 1947
 104th Wing (Provisional), 26 December 1947
 52d Fighter Wing, All-Weather (later, 52d Fighter-All Weather Wing 52d Fighter-Interceptor Wing), 9 June 1948 – 6 February 1952
 4709th Air Defense Wing, 18 August 1955
 4707th Air Defense Wing, 1 March 1956
 4709th Air Defense Wing, 8 July 1956
 4621st Air Defense Wing (later, New York Air Defense Sector), 1 October 1956 – 1 July 1963
 35th Air Division, 30 September 1968
 21st Air Division, 19 November – 31 December 1969
 Seventeenth Air Force, 1 April 1971 – 31 July 1972
 52d Fighter Wing, 31 March 1992 – present

Components
Operational Squadrons
 2d Pursuit (later, 2d Fighter; 2d Fighter [All Weather]; 2d Fighter, All Weather; 2d Fighter-Interceptor) Squadron: 16 January 1941 – 7 November 1945; 9 November 1946 – 6 February 1952; 18 August 1955 – 1 July 1963; 30 September 1968 – 31 December 1969
 4th Pursuit (later, 4th Fighter) Squadron: 16 January 1941 – 7 November 1945
 5th Pursuit (later, 5th Fighter; 5th Fighter [All Weather]; 5th Fighter, All Weather; 5th Fighter-Interceptor) Squadron: 16 January 1941 – 7 November 1945; 9 November 1946 – 6 February 1952; 18 August 1955 – 1 February 1960
 22d Fighter Squadron: 1 April 1994 – 12 August 2010
 23d Fighter Squadron: 31 March 1992 – 12 August 2010
 53d Fighter Squadron: 25 February 1994 – 31 March 1999
81st Fighter Squadron: 31 March 1992 – 18 June 2013
 98th Fighter-Interceptor Squadron: attached, c. 20 June – 1 July 1963
480th Fighter Squadron: 31 March 1992 – 1 April 1994, 13 August 2010 – present
 510th Fighter Squadron: 1 October 1992 – 1 February 1994

Support Organizations

 52d USAF Infirmary (later 52d USAF Dispensary), 18 August 1955 – 1 July 1963, 30 December 1968 – 31 December 1969
 52d Air Base Squadron (later 52d Combat Support Squadron), 18 August 1955 – 1 July 1963, 30 December 1968 – 31 December 1969
 52d Consolidated Aircraft Maintenance Squadron, 8 July 1957 – 1 July 1963, 30 December 1968 – 31 December 1969
 52d Materiel Squadron, 18 August 1955 – 1 July 1963

 52d Operations Support Squadron, 1 October 1992 – present
 52d Supply Squadron, 30 December 1968 – 31 December 1969
 606th Air Control Squadron, 1 October 1993 – present
 7026th Combat Support Squadron, 1 April 1971 – 31 July 1972
 29th Crash Rescue Boat Flight, 18 August 1955 - ca. 8 September 1955

Stations

 Selfridge Field, Michigan, 16 January 1941
 Norfolk Airport, Virginia, 18 December 1941
 Selfridge Field, Michigan, 16 January 1942
 Florence Army Airfield, South Carolina, 18 February 1942
 Wilmington Airport, North Carolina, 27 April 1942
 Grenier Field, New Hampshire, 14 – 24 June 1942
 RAF Eglinton (USAAF Station 344), Derry, Northern Ireland, 14 July 1942
 RAF Goxhill (USAAF Station 345), England, 26 August – 22 October 1942
 Tafaraoui Airfield, Algeria, 9 November 1942
 La Senia Airfield, Oran, Algeria, 14 November 1942
 Orleansville Airfield, Algeria, 2 January 1943
 Telergma Airfield, Algeria, 20 January 1943
 Youks-les-Bains Airfield, Algeria, 9 March 1943
 Le Sers Airfield, Tunisia, 14 April 1943
 La Sebala Airfield, Tunisia, 21 May 1943
 Boccadifalco Airfield, Sicily, 30 July 1943

 Borgo Airfield, Corsica, 1 December 1943
 Aghione Airfield, Corsica, 23 April 1944
 Madna Airfield, Italy, 19 May 1944
 Piagiolino Airfield, Italy, 21 April 1945
 Lesina Airfield, Italy, 8 July – 10 August 1945
 Drew Field, Florida, 25 August – 7 November 1945
 AAF Station Schweinfurt, Germany, 9 November 1946
 AAF Station Bad Kissingen, Germany, 5 May – 25 June 1947
 Mitchel Field (later Mitchel Air Force Base), New York, 25 June 1947
 McGuire Air Force Base, New Jersey, 4 October 1949 – 6 February 1952
 Suffolk County Air Force Base, New York, 18 August 1955 – 1 July 1963; 30 September 1968 – 31 December 1969
 Detachment operated at Atlantic City Airport, New Jersey, 30 September 1968 – 31 December 1969
 Erding Air Base, West Germany, 1 April 1971 – 31 July 1972
 Spangdahlem Air Base, Germany, 31 March 1992 – present 
 Detachment operated at Łask Air Base, Poland, 9 November 2012 – present

Awards and campaigns

Aircraft assigned

 Curtiss P-40 Warhawk (1941–1942)
 Bell P-39 Airacobra (1942)
 Supermarine Spitfire (1942–1944)
 North American P-51 Mustang (1944–1945)
 Northrop P-61 Black Widow (1947, 1947–1948)
 North American F-82 Twin Mustang (1948–1952)
 Lockheed F-94 Starfire (1950–1952)

 North American F-86 Sabre (1955–1957)
 McDonnell F-101 Voodoo (1959–1963, 1968–1969)
 Convair F-102 Delta Dagger (1957–1960)
 McDonnell Douglas F-4G Wild Weasel V (1992–1994)
 General Dynamics F-16C/D Fighting Falcon (1992–present)
 Fairchild Republic A-10 Thunderbolt II (1992–2013)
 McDonnell Douglas F-15C/D Eagle, 1994–1999

See also

References

Notes

Citations

Bibliography

 
 Buss, Lydus H.(ed), Sturm, Thomas A., Volan, Denys, and McMullen, Richard F., History of Continental Air Defense Command and Air Defense Command July to December 1955, Directorate of Historical Services, Air Defense Command, Ent AFB, CO, 1956
 
 
 Grant, C.L., (1961) The Development of Continental Air Defense to 1 September 1954, USAF Historical Study No. 126
 
 
 Newton, Wesley P., Jr. and Senning, Calvin F., (1963) USAF Credits for the Destruction of Enemy Aircraft, World War II, USAF Historical Study No. 85
 
 

Further reading
 
 
 Anonymous, (1958) History of the 52d Fighter Group. Suffolk County Air Force Base, NY 52d Fighter Group, 1958.

052